The government of Yolanda Barcina was formed on 2 July 2011, following the latter's election as President of the Government of Navarre by the Parliament of Navarre on 23 June and her swearing-in on 1 July, as a result of Navarrese People's Union (UPN) emerging as the largest parliamentary force at the 2011 Navarrese regional election and forming an alliance together with the Socialist Party of Navarre (PSN–PSOE), with which it held a majority in the Parliament.

Until 2012, the cabinet comprised five members of UPN (including one independent) and three of the PSN–PSOE, to become the first coalition government between the two parties in the region. On 15 June 2012, following a dispute between the two parties on economic and budgetary affairs, President Barcina expelled PSN leader and vice president Roberto Jiménez from her cabinet, which led to the two remaining PSN members leaving the government. From that point onwards, UPN would form a minority cabinet until the end of Barcina's term. It was automatically dismissed on 25 May 2015 as a consequence of the 2015 regional election, but remained in acting capacity until the next government was sworn in.

Investiture

Cabinet changes
Barcina's government saw a number of cabinet changes during its tenure:
On 15 June 2012, Barcina dismissed PSN-PSOE secretary-general, Roberto Jiménez, as first vice president of her government, accusing him of "disloyalty" following various public statements by Jiménez questioning the situation of Navarra's accounts and suggesting that the public deficit was far superior than the recognized 132 million euros. As a result of the dismissal the other two PSN ministers, Elena Torres Miranda (Social Policy, Equality, Sports and Youth) and Anai Astiz (Development and Housing) announced their resignations, de facto terminating the government coalition between the two parties. The functions of the vacant portfolios were assumed by other government ministers until new replacements could be appointed. On 23 June 2022, a major cabinet reshuffle took place, with Lourdes Goicoechea becoming new vice president and regional minister for Economy, Finance, Industry and Employment, replacing Álvaro Miranda; Juan Luis Sánchez de Muniáin assuming the functions of second vice president; Javier Morrás filling the post of Presidency, Justice and Interior minister; Javier Esparza replacing Goicoechea in the rebranded Rural Development, Environment and Local Administration department; Jesús Pejenaute being appointed as new Social Policies minister; and Luis Zarraluqui being appointed to lead the Development portfolio.
On 21 October 2012, the Social Policies minister, Jesús Pejenaute, resigned from his post after being accused of money laundering to "prevent any false accusations and insults against his person from harming President Barcina and the UPN government". He was replaced in his post by Iñigo Alli on 24 October.

Council of Government
The Council of Government was structured into the offices for the president, the two vice presidents and eight ministries.

Departmental structure
Yolanda Barcina's government was organised into several superior and governing units, whose number, powers and hierarchical structure varied depending on the ministerial department.

Notelist

References

2011 establishments in Navarre
2015 disestablishments in Navarre
Cabinets established in 2011
Cabinets disestablished in 2015
Cabinets of Navarre